Justice Huntington may refer to:

Samuel Huntington (Connecticut politician), chief justice of the Connecticut Supreme Court
Samuel Huntington (Ohio politician), associate justice and chief justice of the Supreme Court of Ohio